BRF may refer to:

 Belgischer Rundfunk, a German-speaking Belgian broadcasting company
 Bitchy resting face, a facial expression
 Bostadsrättsförening, the Swedish word for housing cooperative
 Ramial chipped wood (Bois Raméal Fragmenté in French), a natural fertilizer
 BRF S.A., a Brazilian food corporation
 Black River Falls, Wisconsin
 Bromine monofluoride, a chemical compound
 Belt and Road Forum, international event in Beijing promoting the Belt and Road Initiative
 Braille-Ready Format, a file format used to represent Braille as ASCII characters
 Bâtiment ravitailleur de forces, a type of fleet tanker in the French Navy